is a Japanese adult visual novel producing company, emerged from the former doujin circle Akabei Soft. Some of Akabeisoft2's games have had consumer port releases. For example, 5pb. released W.L.O. Sekai Renai Kikō to the Xbox 360 and Yeti brought Tamayura onto the PlayStation 2 and is no longer porting Sharin no Kuni, Himawari no Shōjo.

Akabeisoft2's G Senjō no Maō was very well received and was awarded the Bishōjo Game Award gold prize in the scenario and graphic categories in addition to the grand prize in 2008. W.L.O. Sekai Renai Kikō was awarded the Moe Game Award silver prize in the character designer category in 2009.

Brands 
 Akabeisoft3
 Cosmic Cute
 Effordom Soft
 Applique
 Akatsuki Works

Former brands 
 Akabeisoft2 TRY 
 Applique Sister (all members joined Akabeisoft3)
 Akatsuki Works Black (all members joined Akabeisoft3)
 Shallot (all members joined Akabeisoft3)
 Spermaniax (all members joined Akabeisoft3)
 Syangrila (all members joined Akabeisoft3)
 Syangrila Smart (all members joined Akabeisoft3)
 Team It's (all members joined Akabeisoft3)
 Wheel

Games
Tamayura, 2005
Sharin no Kuni: The Girl Among the Sunflowers, 2005
Tamayura: Ryoujoku Side, 2006
Sono Yokogao wo Mitsumete Shimau: A Profile Kanzenban, 2006 (remade version of Akabeisoft's A Profile)
Konna Ko ga Itara, Boku wa Mou...!!, 2006
Sharin no Kuni, Yūkyū no Shōnenshōjo, 2007
The Devil on G-String, 2008
Konboku Mahjong: Konna Mahjong ga Attara Boku wa Ron!, 2008
W.L.O. Sekai Renai Kikō, 2009
Okiba ga Nai!, 2010
Kōrin no Machi, Lavender no Shōjo, 2010
Oresama no RagnaRock, 2010 (developed by Akabeisoft2 TRY)
Yaya, Okiba ga nai!, 2011

References

External links
Archived Official Website from 2008 

Amusement companies of Japan
Hentai companies
Video game companies of Japan
Video game development companies